Bataraza, officially the Municipality of Bataraza,  is a 1st class municipality in the province of Palawan, Philippines. According to the 2020 census, it has a population of 85,439 people.

The municipality was named after Datu Bataraza Narrazid, a locally influential Muslim chieftain and father of the town's first mayor and former mayor of Brooke's Point, then Datu Sapiodin Narrazid. Bataraza was part of the municipality of Brooke's Point until 1964 by the virtue of Philippine RA 3425.

Main industries of Bataraza includes farming, fishing, and nickel mining and processing.

History

The town was named after Datu Bataraza Narrazid who served as the father of the town and as the town's first mayor.

Cityhood

House Bill No. 6278 was filed last February 12, 2020 for the conversion of the municipality of Bataraza into a component city in the province of Palawan. The bill is currently pending with the committee on local government since February 18, 2020.

Geography

It has total land area of 957 km2.

On the western side, it extends up to Wangly River.

It is bounded in the east by the Sulu Sea, in the west by a great mountain range, extending from Mount Mantalingahan (the highest peak in the province) to Mount Malitub, which serves as the divider between Bataraza and Rizal, and in the south-west by the South China Sea. Two large crocodiles were recovered here and were taken to Crocodile Farm in Puerto Princesa City.

Barangays
Bataraza is politically subdivided into 22 barangays:

Rio Tuba is one of the populated barangays of Bataraza and known for its nickel mineral reserves. The primary mine site of Rio Tuba Nickel Mining Corporation is located within its jurisdiction.

Climate

Demographics

Economy

Culture
The Molbog people dominate the municipality of Bataraza, as well as the municipality of Balabac in the south. The area constitute the homeland of the Molbog people since the classical era prior to Spanish colonization. The Molbog are known to have a strong connection with the natural world, especially with the sacred pilandok (Philippine mouse-deer), which can only be found in the Balabac islands. A Muslim tale tells the Philippine mouse-deer once tricked a prince into giving up his bag of gold and facing a hive of angry bees. Another tale depicts him as a clever guardian of the environment, using his wisdom as an advantage against those who destroy forests, seas, and wildlife. The coconut is especially important in Molbog culture at it is their most prized agricultural crop.

References

External links
Bataraza Profile at PhilAtlas.com
[ Philippine Standard Geographic Code]
Philippine Census Information
Local Governance Performance Management System

Municipalities of Palawan
Mining communities in the Philippines